Khiram is a village in Anantnag District of the Jammu and Kashmir union territory of India. Khiram village is the largest in the area with a population of 9160 people, among them 4742 (52%) are male and 4418 (48%) are female. The literacy rate is 52%. It is approximately twenty five kilometers (25 km) away from district headquarters of Anantnag  and eighteen kilometers (18 km) away from the Bijbehara.

The Khiram village and Anantnag City are connected by road passing through either via Bijbhara, Srigufwara, and Khiram or Sangam, Marhama, Srihama, Gantaliepora, Khiram roads.

The shrine Khiram Dargah is located here which reportedly houses a relic of the Islamic prophet Muhammad and is the site of attraction for gatherings on Fridays and Islamic festivals. Khiram is surrounded on three sides by mountains which delinks it from surrounding areas like Sallar in east and tral Shikargah in west and north.

Khiram is also famous for its geographical location as it has a vast area covered by mountains. The village Khiram is linked to bijbehara Pahalgam road and National Highway with a road constructed recently in 2019.
Present Imam and khatib Of khiram Shrine and mosque is Nizamuddin Haji 
There are various famous Islamic Scholars including Gull Muhammad Sheikh, Haji Ghulam Mohd. Bhat (ex chairman of auqaf islamia khiram), Ghulam Mohidin Bhat, Ghulam Rasool Bhat, Ahmad ullah parray(Makki) and Mufti Shabir Ahmad Qasmi.

Villages in Anantnag district